Xavier Gomez (born November 21, 1994) is an American soccer player.

He is a native of Des Plaines, IL and graduated from Maine West High School. He was selected No. 41 overall (second round) by Minnesota United FC in the 2018 MLS SuperDraft. Gomez played college soccer at University of Nebraska-Omaha.

References

External links
 
 

1994 births
Living people
American soccer players
Association football midfielders
Chicago FC United players
Lansing Ignite FC players
Minnesota United FC draft picks
Omaha Mavericks men's soccer players
Soccer players from Chicago
USL League One players
USL League Two players
Union Omaha players